Romna pallida is a species of plant bug. It is endemic to New Zealand. It has been found in both the North Island and the South Island. It is found on plants of the genus Sophora.

References

External links
 Images of the holotype and its labels
 NatureWatch NZ

Hemiptera of New Zealand
Miridae